Ainsley (also spelt Ainsleigh) is both a unisex given name and a surname and place name. It is derived from words meaning hermitage and clearing.

Notable people with the name include:

Given name

Men

Ainsley Battles (born 1978), American football player
Ainsley Bennett (born 1954), British sprinter
Ainsley Hall (born 1972), Cayman Islands cricketer
Ainsley Harriott (born 1957), English television chef
Ainsley Maitland-Niles (born 1997), English footballer
Ainsley Waugh (born 1981), Jamaican sprinter
Ainsley Melham (born 1991), Australian actor
Ainsley Iggo (1924–2012), Scottish neurophysiologist
Ainsley Robinson, Canadian wrestler
A. C. de Zoysa (1923–1983), Sri Lankan criminal lawyer

Women

Ainsley Earhardt (born 1978), American television news anchor
Ainsley Gardiner, film producer from New Zealand
Ainsley Gotto (1946–2018), Australian businesswoman
Ainsley Howard, English actress
Ainsley Hamill, Scottish singer

Surname

Ainsleigh

Daniel Ainsleigh (born 1976), English actor and acting coach

Ainsley

George Ainsley (1915–1985), English footballer and manager
Jack Ainsley (born 1990), English footballer
Jacqui Ainsley (born 1981), English model
John Mark Ainsley (born 1963), English opera singer
William Ainsley (1898–1976), English coal miner and politician

See also
Ainsley Canal, a short canal in Chennai, Tamil Nadu, India
Ainsley House, a building in Campbell, California, United States
Aynsley, a given name and surname
Aynsley China, a British manufacturer
Ainley, a surname
Ainslie (disambiguation)

References

English unisex given names